When I Came Back (German: Als ich wiederkam) is a 1926 German silent film directed by Richard Oswald and starring Liane Haid, Max Hansen, and Henry Bender. The film is a sequel to The White Horse Inn (1926) and is based on the play Als ich wiederkam (English title: Twelve Months Later).

It was made at the Emelka Studios in Munich.

Cast
 Liane Haid as Josefa Vogelhuber  
 Max Hansen as Leopold Brandmayer  
 Henry Bender as Wilhelm Giesecke  
 Livio Pavanelli as Dr. Siedler  
 Maly Delschaft as Ottilie Giesecke  
 Hermann Picha as Hinzelmann, Privatgelehrter  
 Ferdinand Bonn 
 Anton Pointner 
 Anita Dorris

References

Bibliography
 Hans-Michael Bock and Tim Bergfelder. The Concise Cinegraph: An Encyclopedia of German Cinema. Berghahn Books.

External links

1926 films
Films of the Weimar Republic
German silent feature films
Films directed by Richard Oswald
German films based on plays
German sequel films
German black-and-white films
Films shot at Bavaria Studios